The 1816 United States presidential election in Pennsylvania took place as part of the 1816 United States presidential election. Voters chose 25 representatives, or electors to the Electoral College, who voted for President and Vice President.

Pennsylvania voted for the Democratic-Republican candidate, James Monroe, over the Federalist candidate, Rufus King. Monroe won Pennsylvania by a margin of 18.66%.

Results

County results

See also
 List of United States presidential elections in Pennsylvania

References

Pennsylvania
1816
1816 Pennsylvania elections